Burgruine Landsee is a castle ruin in the Austrian state of Burgenland.

On Film

The castle was used as a location for Disney's The Three Musketeers (1993 film) starring Kiefer Sutherland, Charlie Sheen, Chris O'Donnell, and Oliver Platt.

See also
List of castles in Austria

References

Castles in Burgenland